Mitiţă Constantinescu (October 20, 1890—1946) was a Romanian economist and liberal politician. He was an advocate of industrialization and a degree of dirigisme.

Biography
Born in Bucharest, he graduated from the Gheorghe Lazăr High School and from the University of Bucharest's Faculty of Law. Applying for a doctorate in Paris, Constantinescu was forced to postpone it after Romania entered World War I, being drafted into the Romanian Army.

In 1918, he was awarded his first high-ranking administrative position, as chief of staff in the Ministry of Industry and Commerce in the National Liberal Party (PNL) cabinet of Ion I. C. Brătianu; Constantinescu held the office of General Secretary in of the Ministry of Agriculture and Royal Domains in a new Brătianu administration (1922–1926), was a PNL deputy for Hunedoara County in 1927-1933, and, between 1935 and 1940, Governor of the National Bank of Romania. In 1939, under the authoritarian regime established by King Carol II and his National Renaissance Front, he was Romania's Minister of Finance.

Retreating from public life during World War II, in protest against Ion Antonescu's fascist dictatorship (see Romania during World War II), Constantinescu was a member of Romania's Gheorghe Tătărescu-led delegation to the Paris Peace Conference (1946). During his later years, he became close to the Romanian Communist Party, created a minor political party named Liga Patrioţilor (League of Patriots) which described itself as "progressive" (and was ultimately led by the communist Petre Constantinescu-Iaşi), and authored a volume supportive of Stalinism and the Soviet Union (Continentul URSS, "The USSR Continent").

A hall at the National Bank is named after him.

References
 Biography
 Constantin Argetoianu, Memoirs (fragment), in Jurnalul Naţional (mention of dispute between Constantinescu and Tătărescu)
 Cristina Deac, "La vremuri noi, tot noi", in Jurnalul Naţional
Victor Frunză, Istoria stalinismului în România, Humanitas, Bucharest, 1990

1890 births
1946 deaths
Governors of the National Bank of Romania
National Liberal Party (Romania) politicians
Romanian Ministers of Finance
Romanian Ministers of Industry and Commerce
Members of the Chamber of Deputies (Romania)
Politicians from Bucharest
Romanian delegation to the Paris Peace Conference of 1946
20th-century Romanian economists
Romanian essayists
University of Bucharest alumni
Gheorghe Lazăr National College (Bucharest) alumni
Members of the Romanian Academy of Sciences
20th-century essayists